When the Green Star Calls is a science fantasy novel by American writer Lin Carter.  Published  by DAW Books in 1973, it is the second novel in his Green Star Series, starting after the first novel, Under the Green Star, finished.

The unnamed narrator once again thrusts his soul towards the Green Star.  On the way, he passes over the moon and sees an iron pillar in a crater.

Plot summary
This time, when he reaches the Green Star planet, he sees a boy about 16 spreadeagled to a branch with rawhide, so as to be killed by marauding animals (or to die of starvation, so his body may be scavenged).  A huge scorpion or phuol attacks the boy and then withdraws (waiting for its venom to paralyse, so it can then consume his still-living flesh later).

At that point, a man comes out from concealment behind branches, kills the phuol with a lightning-emitting wand, and rescues the boy in a sky-sled, which the narrator follows to a city which appears dead (later finding out this is so).  The rescuer applies salves and injections to the boy, who dies during the night (known to the narrator, but not the rescuer) whereupon the narrator takes possession of the just-dead body; it takes him a little while to reconcile the memories of this new body, whose name he finds to be Karn the Hunter (of Red Dragon Tribe—the "Red Dragon" being a reference to the ythid), with his soul memories from his earlier incarnation as Chong The Mighty.

Karn soon finds out that the dead city (known as Sotaspra) is a taboo area of the planet, only visited (or inhabited) by some scientists/savants such as his rescuer Sarchimus (self-titled "The Wise").  Indeed, Sarchimus considers all of the other savants of the city as rivals, chief of them Hume "Of The Many Eyes".  Sarchimus warns Karn not to go exploring on his own—when Karn disobeys, he discovers the city is full of many mutant creatures, including a "death-fungus" which he narrowly misses, "crawler-vines" which try to strangle him and an amorphous creature Sarchimus calls "saloog", all of which were formed due to radiation from the crystals of which Sotaspra was constructed (when the crystals had energy, and the city was alive).  Karn is astute enough to understand that Sarchimus did not rescue him for altruistic reasons.

Sometime later, when Sarchimus has gone on an errand, Karn goes to another area where Sarchimus has forbidden him access—a set of doors sealed with Sarchimus' symbol, a scarlet hand.  Doing so, he discovers that Sarchimus' experiments are partly guided by an original inhabitant of the city.

Karn had earlier seen some statues of winged humanoids in very commonplace positions—but these were made of chalk, a rather brittle material; the inhabitant is the last living member of these "genii" as Karn thinks of them, over a million years old.  The immortal, Zarqa the kalood (meaning "flying ones") tells him that the statues are the result of a failed experiment of immortality which produced a compound known as "Elixir of Light".  Even correctly formulated, the Elixir lengthened the lives of male kaloodha but sterilised them as a price—while having no effect on the females, thus causing a slow extinction of this noble race; the statues are the result of consuming this elixir mixed lacking a crucial ingredient.  Sarchimus has much-tortured Zarqa to find out the formulation—at the time Karn finds him, he has revealed all except one ingredient but not the correct formula.  Karn is also told that there is another human captive, a Phaolonian, in the tower (who he finds at a later opportunity—recognising by face, but not by name—to be named Janchan).

Eventually, Sarchimus treats Karn to a drugged feast (and then chains him) as a prelude to testing the Elixir on him—boasting that Zarqa (he doesn't reveal the name, as he does not know of Karn's knowledge) has revealed the correct formula to him.  Karn is invigorated and strengthened greatly by the Elixir, but cannot break the chains fastened to him.  Pleased at this sight, Sarchimus consumes the rest—and finds himself petrifying to chalk.  Zarqa (who had been held in an energy-barrier set to Sarchimus' frequency) then releases Karn (and reveals to him the missing ingredient to be a component distilled from phuol venom—Karn was protected by residues of the venom from the stinging he had earlier received), who then releases Janchan.  The three then find a map to Ardha and Phaolon—which they find are about 3,000 farasang (a unit of time misused by Laonese also for distance) away.

Janchan enters Ardha and obtains employment as a soldier.  In this employ, he finds Niamh (who was recaptured by Siona's band after her escape attempt and then given to Arjala the "goddess" of Ardha as captive—due to rivalry between Arjala and Akhmim, this allowed some power-josting).  Soldiers in Arjala's employ have also captured Zarqa and display him as an amphasand, a mythical creature sacred to the Laonese.  Janchan makes careful plans to rescue Niamh and Zarqa.

Karn meanwhile has been attacked by a large bumblebee or zzumalak, which he mortally wounds—only to land in a swimming pool where the bee drops him.  Taking some coins from this house, he runs into a trio of men who fight and capture him—who turn out to be of the assassin guild.  One of this trio, Klygon, soon trains Karn in the arts of the guild.  The chief of the guild, an obese man named Gurjan Tor (who most-closely resembles Jabba the Hutt of Star Wars), asks Karn to kill Niamh and Zarqa with a poisoned stiletto—and posts Klygon as his "partner" to ensure that Karn will not fluff the job or run away.

Karn and Klygon fly to the temple tower (where Niamh is held) on zaiphs, and find Janchan and Zarqa in the process of rescuing Niamh.  Janchan's rescue goes somewhat awry as Arjala is present with two (very large, muscular eunuch) temple guards.  Janchan's plans have been made in order to AVOID having a fight with these toughs (as he particularly fears they may raise an alarm); in desperation, he throws a lamp at one, breaking both it and the eunuch's skull (and discovers that the doomed eunuchs are also mute).  The dead eunuch's body strikes Arjala knocking her unconscious—and forcing Janchan to rescue her as well.  He quickly grabs Arjala and Niamh and puts them in the sky-sled with Zarqa.

Karn who has seen this is now afraid that Klygon may kill him—as promised to Gurjan Tor.

The cliffhanger above is the starting point for the series' third novel, By the Light of the Green Star.

1973 American novels
1973 fantasy novels
1973 science fiction novels
Novels by Lin Carter
American fantasy novels
DAW Books books